Lola Tung (born October 28, 2002) is an American actress, who stars as Isabel "Belly" Conklin in the 2022 Amazon Prime series, The Summer I Turned Pretty based on the Jenny Han novel of the same name.

Early life and education 
Lola Tung grew up in New York City and graduated from Fiorello H. LaGuardia High School of Music & Art and Performing Arts in 2020. Her mother is Pia Tung.

In fall 2020, she began studying at Carnegie Mellon University School of Drama as an acting major. She completed her first year of school and then took a year off to film The Summer I Turned Pretty.

Tung also plays guitar and sings.

Career 
In her senior year of high school, Tung acted in LaGuardia's virtual senior acting showcase, where her current manager saw her first perform. Months later, during the second semester of Tung's freshman year at Carnegie Mellon University, the manager reached out to her to begin working together and with an audition. The audition was for the titular role of Isabel "Belly" Conklin in The Summer I Turned Pretty, Amazon Prime's television adaptation of Jenny Han's bestselling trilogy. While taking remote college classes, Tung auditioned for the series on Zoom. She later landed the job, which is her first credited acting role. Before the first season's release, Amazon Prime renewed the series for a second season, which the cast is filming in summer 2022.

In September 2021, shortly after landing the leading role in The Summer I Turned Pretty, Tung signed with American talent agency, Creative Artists Agency.

Filmography

Television

Audiobooks

References

External links
 

2002 births
Living people
Fiorello H. LaGuardia High School alumni
American web series actresses
Carnegie Mellon University alumni
Actresses from New York City
21st-century American actresses